For a list of current members of the United States Congress, see:

 List of current United States senators
 List of current members of the United States House of Representatives